The 1951 Sicilian regional election took place on 3 June 1951 to select the Second Sicilian Parliament.

Christian Democracy resulted narrowly ahead of the alliance between the Italian Communist Party and the Italian Socialist Party. After the election Franco Restivo, the incumbent Christian Democratic President, formed a government that included the Monarchist National Party and the Autonomist Independentist Liberal Sicilian Union, a spin-off of declined Sicilian independentists.

Results
Electoral system: proportional representation

Sources: Istituto Cattaneo and Sicilian Regional Assembly

References

Elections in Sicily
1951 elections in Italy
June 1951 events in Europe